Mandvi was a Lok Sabha parliamentary constituency in Surat,Gujarat.(1952-2008).Part of Bombay presidency till 1960 then part of Gujarat state.

This constituency was demolished  in 2008 as a part of the implementation of delimitation of parliamentary constituencies. The seat is reserved for Scheduled Tribes. Bardoli Loksabha constituency was created in 2008.

Members of Parliament

1952-61: Constituency does not exist
1962: C. M. Kedaria, Indian National Congress
1967: C. M. Kedaria, Indian National Congress
1971: Amarsinh Zinabhai Chaudhary, Indian National Congress
1977: Chhitubhai Gamit, Indian National Congress
1980: Chhitubhai Gamit, Indian National Congress
1984: Chhitubhai Gamit, Indian National Congress
1989: Chhitubhai Gamit, Indian National Congress
1991: Chhitubhai Gamit, Indian National Congress
1996: Chhitubhai Gamit, Indian National Congress
1998: Chhitubhai Gamit, Indian National Congress
1999: Mansinh Patel, Bharatiya Janata Party
2004: Tushar Amarsinh Chaudhary, Indian National Congress
2008 onwards: Constituency does not exist

See also
 List of Constituencies of the Lok Sabha
 Bardoli constituency

References

Former Lok Sabha constituencies of Gujarat
Former constituencies of the Lok Sabha
2008 disestablishments in India
Constituencies disestablished in 2008